The list of people who belong to ethnic minorities who have been elected as Members of the House of Commons of the United Kingdom, European Union, and other British devolved assemblies and also Members of the non-elected House of Lords.

In 2001, Muhammad Anwar of Warwick University wrote a paper titled "The participation of ethnic minorities in British politics" that was published in the Journal of Ethnic and Migration Studies (2001) that in part examined the representation of ethnic minorities at national levels of the British political system.  In a chapter in the edited book Race and British Electoral Politics (Routledge, 1998), Andrew Geddes, now Professor of Politics at University of Sheffield, explored the question of "what factors contribute to low levels of ethnic minority representation in the House of Commons".

According to a research paper from House of Commons of the United Kingdom Library, published in 2020, the first ethnic minority MP was elected in 1767 – excluding Jews, who a House of Commons Library briefing paper states generally considered themselves to be a religious rather than an ethnic minority in the 18th/19th century. This was James Townsend, a Whig MP whose mother was of African origin. Townsend later became the first Black Mayor of London in 1772.

Following the election of Anas Sarwar as Scottish Labour Party leader in February 2021, he was described as the first person from an ethnic minority to lead a major British political party, which led to debate about why Jewish party leaders had been excluded from this comparison. Stephen Bush, the political editor of the New Statesman, wrote that "As far as British law is concerned, the answer is open-and-shut: we count as both an ethnic and a religious grouping for the purpose of equalities and employment law." He stated: "Whether Benjamin Disraeli would feel today that he were an ethnic-minority Briton is unknowable: but we can say with copper-bottomed certainty that he and other ethnically-Jewish Britons faced what we would now recognise as workplace discrimination in addition to the open dissemination of racist tropes about Disraeli and his family by his political opponents." The House of Commons Library briefing paper notes that the first practising Jew to sit in the Commons was Lionel de Rothschild, who was first elected in 1847 but who refused to take the Christian oath that MPs are required to swear. He took his seat once the rules had been changed, allowing him to swear on the Old Testament.

At the 2001 general election, the Parliament of the United Kingdom had twelve ethnic minority Members of Parliament (excluding Jews), and after the 2005 general election; that number increased to fifteen.  With the 2010 general election, the Parliament of the United Kingdom reported that the number of ethnic minority MPs increased by nearly three-quarters, to a total of 26.  The first three Muslim female MPs were elected.  All ethnic minority MPs were either Labour (15) or Conservative (11). In October 2013, the UK Parliament reported that the number of ethnic minority MPs stood at 27, or 4.2% of the total.

After the 2015 general election, 41 MPs from an ethnic minority background were elected to Parliament. 25 of the previous 27 ethnic minority MPs retained their seats and were joined by 16 new ethnic minority MPs. 23 were from the Labour Party, 17 of them were Conservatives and one from the SNP. In the 2017 general election, 52 ethnic minority MPs were elected, including 32 Labour MPs, 19 Conservatives and one Liberal Democrat, according to think tank British Future and the House of Commons Library. In the 2019 general election, this figure rose to 66, with 23 Conservative, 41 Labour and two Liberal Democrat non-white MPs.

Based on data from unofficial sources including Operation Black Vote, the House of Commons Library estimated in a research briefing published in September 2022 that there were 55 ethnic minority members of the House of Lords . Of these, 11 were affiliated with the Labour Party, 16 were crossbenchers, 16 were Conservatives, six were Liberal Democrats, and six were unaffiliated.

List of ethnic minority Prime Ministers of the United Kingdom in the House of Commons

List of ethnic minority Members of the Cabinet in the House of Commons

List of ethnic minority Ministers in the House of Commons

List of ethnic minority Members of Parliament

List of ethnic minority Members of the Cabinet in the House of Lords

List of ethnic minority Ministers in the House of Lords

List of ethnic minority Members of the House of Lords

List of ethnic minority Members of the European Parliament

List of ethnic minority London Assembly Members

List of ethnic minority Scottish Parliament Members

List of ethnic minority Members of the Senedd

List of ethnic minority Northern Irish Assembly Members

List of ethnic minority Police and Crime Commissioners

List of ethnic minority directly elected mayors

Notes 

United Kingdom
Lists of politicians from the United Kingdom